Don Miller (born August 19, 1956) was a one-term Republican member of the Tennessee House of Representatives for the 10th district, encompassing Morristown and Hamblen County.

Education and personal life
Don Miller was born on August 19, 1956, in Montgomery, Alabama. He received a B.S. in Government & Business from Auburn University, and an M.R.E. from Southwestern Baptist Theological Seminary.

Before running for office, he worked as a business administrator for Manley Baptist Church in Morristown. He is a member of the National Rifle Association and the Hamblen County Republican Party.

He is married to Traci, with two children, Matthew and Meagan. He is a Baptist.

Political career 
In 2008, he was elected as a delegate to the 2008 Republican National Convention for John McCain.

In 2011, he was elected as the Republican state Assemblyman for the 10th district, the seat formerly represented by John Litz.

In 2012, Don Miller was defeated in a Republican primary race by Representative Tilman Goins.

References

Living people
1956 births
Politicians from Montgomery, Alabama
Auburn University alumni
Southwestern Baptist Theological Seminary alumni
Republican Party members of the Tennessee House of Representatives